Events from the year 1778 in Ireland.

Incumbent
Monarch: George III

Events
28 March – Hugh O'Reilly succeeds Daniel O'Reilly as Roman Catholic Bishop of Clogher, an office he will hold until 1801.
April – the Ladies of Llangollen run away from Ireland to set up a rural household together.
24 April – American Revolutionary War: North Channel Naval Duel: John Paul Jones in  captures  in the North Channel off Carrickfergus. 
Papists Act provides a measure of Catholic Relief: Catholics now have property rights and may intermarry; and restoration of Catholic religious institutions begins.
Charles Vallancey surveys West Cork.

Births
4 March – Robert Emmet, nationalist, rebel against British rule in 1803 (executed 1803).
18 May – Charles Stewart, 3rd Marquess of Londonderry, soldier, politician and nobleman (died 1854).
29 September – Catherine McAuley, nun (died 1841).
15 November – George Canning, 1st Baron Garvagh, politician (died 1840).

Deaths
March – Thomas Roberts, landscape painter (born 1748).
28 March – Daniel O’Reilly, Roman Catholic Bishop of Clogher (born 1700).

References 

 
Years of the 18th century in Ireland
Ireland
1770s in Ireland